L'inchiesta (internationally released as The Inquiry) is a 1986 Italian historical drama film directed by Damiano Damiani. For this film Lina Sastri was awarded with a David di Donatello for Best Supporting Actress. The film had a remake with the same title in 2006.

Plot

Cast 
 Keith Carradine as Titus Valerius Taurus
 Harvey Keitel as  Pontius Pilate
 Lina Sastri as  Mary Magdalene
 Phyllis Logan as Claudia Procula 
 Angelo Infanti as  Trifone
 Luciano Bartoli  as  Criside
 John Forgeham as Marco 
 Erik Schumann as  Flavio
 Georgia Slowe as  Sara 
 Salvatore Borghese

See also    
 List of Italian films of 1986

References

External links

1986 films
1986 drama films
Italian drama films
1980s Italian-language films
English-language Italian films
1980s English-language films
Films directed by Damiano Damiani
Films scored by Riz Ortolani
Films about Christianity
Films set in the 1st century
Films set in the Roman Empire
Films set in Jerusalem
Cultural depictions of Pontius Pilate
1986 multilingual films
Italian multilingual films
1980s Italian films